Azerat is a commune in the Dordogne department in Nouvelle-Aquitaine in southwestern France. The A89 motorway passes by the village.

Population

Personalities
Robert Lacoste
Maurice Faure
Outside the chapel is the house of the socialist Suzanne Lacore, first female undersecretary of state in the first government of Léon Blum and former schoolteacher.

See also
Communes of the Dordogne department

References

Communes of Dordogne